Viola Vogel, also known as Viola Vogel-Scheidemann, (born 1959 in Tübingen, Germany) is a German biophysicist and bioengineer. She is a professor at ETH Zürich, where she is head of the Department of Health Sciences and Technology and leads the Applied Mechanobiology Laboratory.

Biography
Vogel was born in 1959 in the university town of Tübingen in the state of Baden-Württemberg, Germany. In 1988 she won an Otto Hahn Medal for her doctoral work with Hans Kuhn at the Max Planck Institute for Biophysical Chemistry, Göttingen. In 1990, after two years as a postdoctoral fellow at  the Department of Physics at the University of California, Berkeley, she took a faculty position in the Department of Bioengineering at the University of Washington in Seattle where she initiated the molecular bioengineering program. She was subsequently founding director of the Center for Nanotechnology at the University of Washington (1997-2003). In 2004 she relocated to ETH Zürich in Switzerland, first as a professor in the Department of Material Sciences, and later as a founding member of the Department of Health Sciences and Technology (2012). She has been a faculty member of the Wyss Translational Center in Zürich since it began in 2015.

In 2020, Vogel was appointed by European Commissioner for Innovation, Research, Culture, Education and Youth Mariya Gabriel to serve on an independent search committee for the next president of the European Research Council (ERC), chaired by Helga Nowotny.

Research
The direction of Vogel's work is to take microscopic pieces of living tissue and investigate their mechanical properties, with a view to developing new technologies. Her interests include molecular self-assembly, cell adhesion, and the construction of biological minerals, materials, and tissues. Her experimental and computational discoveries of how stretching proteins changes their function, and how cells sense and respond to force, have applications in stem cell differentiation, tissue growth and regeneration, angiogenesis, and cancer.

Awards
She was elected to the German Academy of Sciences Leopoldina in 2018, member of US National Academy of Engineering in 2020 and US National Academy of Sciences in 2021.

References

1959 births
Living people
German women biologists
Women biophysicists
Biophysicists
German women physicists
German women engineers
German biophysicists
German bioengineers
Mechanobiologists
Academic staff of ETH Zurich
Members of the German Academy of Sciences Leopoldina
21st-century women engineers
People from Tübingen
Engineers from Baden-Württemberg